Heaven's Seven  ( Thai: 7 ประจัญบาน ) is a Thai action and  comedy film that was a remake of a television  movie. Chalerm Wong Pim, who is a Thai director, decided to remake Heaven's Seven, and the remake was released on 26 April 2002. Heaven's Seven movie is based on the third part of an original film that was shown on 22 January 1963 in Thailand.

Plot
The story of the movie starts when group of seven Thai Army Black Panthers Division finish their last risky mission in Vietnam War. They retire from the military and go on to continue ordinary life with their families. However, bad memories still haunt them. Later, a merchant hires them to steal a load of gold from a truck caravan. Unfortunately, these belong to G.I.s of the U.S.Army. The U.S. soldiers are angry about the theft and try to catch the seven soldiers by attacking the Thai soldier's village. After the U.S. troops capture all the villagers, they make the villagers slaves. Meanwhile, the seven Thai fighters learn that the trucks do not contain any gold, but they contain dangerous chemical agent that U.S. forces intend use to destroy forests in Vietnam. Then, they go to the U.S. military camp to fight against the americans and successfully rescue their people to save their friends and relatives. The movie ends with Juk's ordination for his mother, which suddenly turned into his mother's funeral after she was too happy and died.

Cast
 Pongpat Wachirabunjong as Sgt. Dab Jampoh
 Pongsak Pongsuwan as Mhad Cherngmuay
 Thodsapol Siriwiwat as Tanguay Sae-lee
 Amarin itipon as Akkhi Mekyant
 Pisek Intrakanchit as Dhan Mahittha
 Cham Charum as Kla talumpook
 Akom Preedakul as Juk Biewsakul

Reception
This film is the one of Thai movies that earned the highest box office returns in Thailand. The film was successful and earned about 8.3 million baht. Later, Chalern Wong Pim created a sequel of this movie called Heaven's Seven 2 (Thai: 7 ประจัญบาน ภาค 2 ) that was released on 28 April 2005.

References

Thai action comedy films